The Arachthos is a river in eastern Epirus, Greece. Its source is in the Pindus mountains, near the town Metsovo (Ioannina regional unit). Its upper course is known as Metsovitikos. From its confluence with the Dipotamos near the village of Batza it is called Arachthos. It flows towards the south, passing between the Athamanika and the Xerovouni mountains. In this place meets the Plaka Bridge, the largest one-arch stone bridge in Greece. It enters the large Pournari Reservoir, in the Arta regional unit, which is about 18 km² and prevents flooding of the city of Arta and also supplies water to most of Epirus. The town of Peta is situated near the dam. Arta, about 8 km downstream of the dam, is the largest town on the river. Arta's historic landmark is the stone Bridge of Arta over the Arachthos. The river continues through the lowlands south of Arta, and finally empties into the Ambracian Gulf near Kommeno, 16 km southeast of Arta.

References

External links
Arachthos River on GTP Travel Pages (in English and Greek)
MandraPhotos
Photo of Arachthos Lake
Arachthos River on Webshots
Arachthos Gorge photo
Arahthos Festival

Rivers of Epirus (region)
Rivers of Greece
Landforms of Ioannina (regional unit)
Landforms of Arta (regional unit)
Pindus